Hvammen is a surname. Notable people with the surname include:

 Aud Hvammen (born 1943), Norwegian alpine skier
 Espen Aarnes Hvammen (born 1988), Norwegian speed skater
 Margit Hvammen (1932–2010), Norwegian alpine skier

Norwegian-language surnames